Emmenanthe is a monotypic genus which contains only one species, Emmenanthe penduliflora, known by the common name whispering bells. This grassland wildflower is native to California, though it can also be found in other locations within western North America.

Description 
Emmenanthe is monotypic genus of annual plants with fleshy foliage which exudes a sticky juice with a light medicinal odor. The plant comes up from a weedy-looking basal rosette of sharply lobed leaves. Inflorescence is a terminal cluster of flowers, borne on slender pedicels less than 1 inch long.  Blooms have five sepals and five yellow or pinkish petals in a bell-shaped.  Flowers dry and become light and papery. The dry hanging flowers make a rustling sound when a breeze comes through, giving the whispering bells its common name. The dry flower also contains a fruit about a centimeter wide.

Distribution & habitat
This flower is most common in dry, recently burned areas; germination of the seeds may be triggered by the presence of burned plant material. It is a common plant of the chaparral ecosystem, which is prone to wildfire.

In Mexico, this species is found on the two states of the Baja California Peninsula. In Baja California, it is common in the northwestern part of the state, and ranges into the Central Desert. In Baja California Sur, it is found on the Vizcaino Peninsula. Additionally, this species also grows on Guadalupe Island in the Pacific Ocean.

References

External links 
 Jepson Manual Treatment - Emmenanthe
 USDA Plants Profile; Emmenanthe
 Emmenanthe - Photo gallery
 

Hydrophylloideae
Monotypic asterid genera
Flora of Baja California
Flora of Baja California Sur
Flora of California
Flora of Mexican Pacific Islands
Boraginaceae genera